Universe is a 1976 American short documentary film directed by Lester Novros. It was nominated for an Academy Award for Best Documentary Short.

References

External links

1976 films
American short documentary films
1970s short documentary films
Documentary films about outer space
1970s English-language films
1970s American films